Eucalyptus sparsa, commonly known as the northern ranges box, is a species of mallee that is endemic to inland Australia, near the border between the Northern Territory, South Australia and Western Australia border. It has smooth pale grey and brown bark, often with rough bark on the base of larger trunks, lance-shaped adult leaves, flower buds usually in groups of seven, white flowers and shortened spherical to conical fruit.

Description
It has smooth pale grey to pale brown bark, often with rough, fibrous or flaky bark on larger trunks. Flowering occurs from July to September or from January to February and the flowers are white.

Taxonomy and naming
Eucalyptus sparsa was first formally described in 1979 by Clifford David Boomsma near Betty's Creek Gorge in the Everard Ranges in 1974. The specific epithet (sparsa) refers to its sparse occurrence in South Australia.

Distribution and habitat
The northern ranges box grows on sand dunes and on plains and slopes on well-drained soil. It is found near the Blackstone, Petermann, Tomkinson and Musgrave Ranges near the border between Western Australia, South Australia and the Northern Territory.

Conservation status
This mallee is classified as "Priority Three" by the Government of Western Australia Department of Parks and Wildlife meaning that it is poorly known and known from only a few locations but is not under imminent threat.

See also
List of Eucalyptus species

References

Eucalypts of Western Australia
sparsa
Myrtales of Australia
Mallees (habit)
Plants described in 1979